Pietro Parolin OMRI (born 17 January 1955) is an Italian prelate of the Catholic Church. A cardinal since February 2014, he has served as the Vatican's Secretary of State since October 2013 and a member of the Council of Cardinal Advisers since July 2014. Before that, he worked in the diplomatic service of the Holy See for thirty years, where his assignments included terms in Nigeria, Mexico and Venezuela, as well as more than six years as Undersecretary of State for Relations with States.

He speaks fluent Italian, English and French, and near-native Spanish.

Early life
Parolin was born in Schiavon, Province of Vicenza, the son of a hardware store manager and an elementary school teacher. He has one sister and a brother. When he was ten years old, his father died in a car accident. After he was ordained on 27 April 1980, he took up graduate studies in canon law at the Pontifical Gregorian University and in diplomacy at the Pontifical Ecclesiastical Academy. He entered the Holy See's diplomatic service in 1986 at the age of 31.

He served for three years in the Nunciature of Nigeria where he became familiar with the problems in Christian-Muslim relations.

At the Nunciature of Mexico from 1989 to 1992, he contributed to the final phase of the work begun by Archbishop Girolamo Prigione which led to the legal recognition of the Catholic Church in 1992 and the establishment of diplomatic relations between the Holy See and Mexico after 130 years. These negotiations led to Mexico officially shedding the country's secular and anti-clerical imprint, which extended to its Constitution.

Working in Rome, he was country director for Spain, Andorra, Italy, and San Marino.

Undersecretary of State for Relations with States
Parolin was Undersecretary of State for Relations with States from 30 November 2002 to 17 August 2009.

Parolin has also been at the forefront of Vatican efforts to approve and implement the Nuclear Nonproliferation Treaty (NPT). Addressing the International Atomic Energy Agency on 18 September 2006, at its headquarters in Vienna, Parolin referred to this treaty as "the basis to pursue nuclear disarmament and an important element for further development of nuclear energy applications for peaceful purposes." He said: "Since this treaty is the only multilateral legal instrument currently available, intended to bring about a nuclear weapons-free world, it must not be allowed to be weakened. Humanity deserves no less than the full cooperation of all states in this important matter." Concerning international negotiations with respect to Iran's nuclear program, he said "that the present difficulties can and must be overcome through diplomatic channels, making use of all the means that diplomacy has at its disposal and considers necessary to eliminate all the elements which objectively impede mutual trust."

In September 2007 at the opening of the UN he argued that, "We often hear in the halls of the United Nations of 'the responsibility to protect'. The Holy See believes that applies also in the context of climate change. States have a shared 'responsibility to protect' the world's climate through mitigation/adaptation, and above all a shared 'responsibility to protect' our planet and ensure that present and future generations be able to live in a healthy and safe environment."

Parolin represented the Vatican in a variety of sensitive assignments, including trips to North Korea and Vietnam as well as the 2007 Annapolis Conference on the Middle East convened by the Bush administration to revive Israeli-Palestinian peace talks.

As the Vatican's "deputy foreign minister" he dealt with all the sensitive dossiers on the Holy See's relations with Vietnam (he was partly responsible for paving the way to full diplomatic relations between the two) and the legal issues between the Vatican and Israel which remain unresolved. At the beginning of Pope Benedict's pontificate, direct contact was re-established with China.

During his time as undersecretary Parolin scored some significant breakthroughs, such as cementing ties between the Holy See and Vietnam, re-establishing direct contact with Beijing in 2005 and helping secure the liberation of 15 British navy personnel captured by Iranian forces in the Persian Gulf in April 2007.

Nuncio

On 17 August 2009 Pope Benedict XVI appointed Parolin Titular Archbishop of Aquipendium and Apostolic Nuncio to Venezuela. He was consecrated a bishop on 12 September 2009 by Benedict XVI, with Tarcisio Cardinal Bertone and William Cardinal Levada as co-consecrators. The Venezuela assignment was expected to be difficult, since conflicts between the State and the Church in Venezuela were on the rise as President Hugo Chávez attempted to advance his socialist revolution.

Secretary of State

On 31 August 2013, Pope Francis appointed Parolin Secretary of State, replacing Cardinal Tarcisio Bertone. Parolin took office on 15 October.

Parolin became, at 58, the youngest Secretary of State since 1929, when Eugenio Cardinal Pacelli (later Pope Pius XII) was appointed to the position at the age of 53. He said: "The pope's initiatives have given the secretary of state an impetus and have also created a new diplomatic momentum." When asked if he would be spearheading a new diplomatic offensive for peace, he noted that it was a complicated question but said, "Yes, I hope that we can recoup" that drive. "We have this great advantage in respect to other churches, to other religions: We can count on an international institutional presence through diplomacy," he said.

On 16 December, Parolin was named to a five-year renewable term as a member of the Congregation for Bishops. On 19 February 2014 he was appointed a member of the Congregation for the Oriental Churches.

Parolin was made Cardinal-Priest of Santi Simone e Giuda Taddeo a Torre Angela at a papal general consistory on 22 February 2014. He attended meetings of the Council of Cardinal Advisers on a regular basis and in July 2014 became the council's ninth member.

In 2014 Venezuela's President Nicolas Maduro invited Cardinal Parolin to mediate talks between his government and opposition in hopes of stemming violence that has killed dozens in the nation's worst unrest in a decade. He asked that Parolin, a former nuncio to Venezuela, be named a "good faith witness" to a dialogue the parties had agreed upon after two months of protests. Venezuela's opposition coalition had indicated that current nuncio, Archbishop Aldo Giordano, would be attending the first formal talks. Henrique Capriles, the opposition's two-time presidential candidate who narrowly lost an election to Maduro the year before, confirmed he would take part in the discussions.

In December 2014 Cardinal Parolin asked the U.S. to find an "adequate humanitarian solution" for prisoners held at the Guantanamo Bay detention camp, a reflection of Pope Francis' concern that prisoners be treated with dignity and not be subject to inhumane treatment. Parolin made the request during a Vatican meeting with U.S. Secretary of State John Kerry. The Vatican said they discussed the U.S. commitment to closing the facility and that Parolin expressed the Holy See's desire that "favourable attention be paid to finding adequate humanitarian solutions for current inmates".

The Holy See was credited with playing a major role in the reestablishment of U.S.-Cuba relations. Parolin moderated the October 2014 meeting between Cuban and U.S. officials as their negotiations neared an agreement. In 2015, Cardinal Parolin was asked whether the normalisation of Cuba – U.S. relations pointed toward a new "golden age" of Vatican diplomacy. He said that "the president of the United States has already thanked the Pope for the support he has given to this important step" and said: "Holy See diplomacy is always there, to help to build bridges". Parolin also said the Holy See's diplomacy "is now more active…(not only) waiting, but also proposing (solutions for peace), since there are so many conflicts."

Parolin called for an intervention in Libya to stop a possible alliance between the country's Islamic government and the Islamic State. Parolin spoke about the chaos there after ISIS beheaded 21 Egyptian Coptic Christians, describing the incident as "terrifying" and the situation "grave". He stressed the need for "a quick response". Parolin added that "any armed intervention must be carried forward under the framework of international law" and "under the umbrella of the United Nations".

In May 2015, after the passage of the Marriage Equality Referendum in Ireland, which extended marriage rights to same-sex couples, Parolin said: "I was very saddened by this result. I don't think we can speak only about a defeat for Christian principles, but a defeat for humanity." In June 2015, he visited Abu Dhabi to inaugurate Saint Paul's Church in Musaffah, the city's second Catholic parish.

Cardinal Parolin has stressed the importance of continuity. He believes Pope Francis simply tries to guide the church to be the church of Christ and that he is not starting a revolution. He defends the importance of unchangeable dogmas and asserts the relevance of sacred tradition. He said celibacy is a discipline that could be changed but that it cannot simply be dismissed as outdated. In a keynote speech at the Pontifical Gregorian University in February 2016, Cardinal Parolin defended celibacy as a "gift" that must be received and nurtured with "joyful perseverance" and criticized the suggestion that the shortage of vocations be addressed by modifying the requirement of priestly celibacy.

In May 2016 Parolin visited Estonia to mark the 25th anniversary of the reintroduction of diplomatic relations between Estonia and the Holy See. He spoke at the University of Tartu on the precise meaning of their international relations.

Parolin was appointed a member of the Congregation for Divine Worship and the Discipline of the Sacraments in October 2016.

Following the resignation of Marie Collins from the Pontifical Commission for the Protection of Minors, Parolin said she quit because she wanted to "shake the tree" in the Vatican. Collins said some members of the Church's administration, the Roman Curia, have hindered and blocked the commission's efforts, naming the Congregation for the Doctrine of the Faith. Parolin called the lack of cooperation from some Vatican offices "shameful".

Parolin told Italy's La Stampa the flow of migrants and refugees into Europe is testing "the spirit of solidarity and subsidiarity" of the European Union, and acknowledged the large number of people fleeing to the continent poses a security problem. "Terrorism certainly finds fertile ground in poverty, lack of jobs, and social marginalization", he said, adding that since World War II, Europe has tried to "free itself" from its cultural heritage and values, and this has created a vacuum in which young people cannot find the answers to their existential questions.

In 2017, Parolin became the Vatican's first Secretary of State in 19 years to visit Moscow.

In a 2018 interview, Cardinal Joseph Zen said "Pope Francis does not know the real Communist Party in China, but Parolin should know. He was there [in the Secretariat of State] so many years, so he must know. He may be happy to encourage the pope to be optimistic about the negotiations ... but that's dangerous. Pope Francis needs someone to calm him down from his enthusiasm." He added that "It seems the Secretary of State wants to have a solution anyway. He is so optimistic. That's dangerous. I told the pope that he [Parolin] has a poisoned mind. He is very sweet, but I have no trust in this person. He believes in diplomacy, not in our faith." Parolin countered that "no personal point of view can be considered as an exclusive interpreter of what is good for Chinese Catholics" and said: "If someone is asked to make a sacrifice, small or great, it must be clear to everyone that this is not the price of a political exchange, but falls within the evangelical perspective of a greater good, the good of the Church of Christ."

Parolin has been called papabile, a candidate to succeed Francis as pope.

Pope Francis raised him to the rank of Cardinal Bishop effective 28 June 2018.

In October 2018, Parolin said that Paul VI rejected a version of Humane Vitae that "was limited to a rigorous reaffirmation of doctrine to which Christians and all people were asked to adhere docilely and without reservation". Post-publication debates, Cardinal Parolin said, made it impossible for many people to see its accent on mercy.

In 2019, Parolin defended the Holy See-China agreement on the appointment of bishops. "We signed this agreement to help advance religious freedom, to find normalization for the Catholic community there, and then for all other religions to have space and a role to play in society which is recognized," Parolin told journalists on 3 April. Steve Bannon said that he might lead a lawsuit to compel the Holy See to release the text of the deal under the terms of the 1961 Vienna Convention on Diplomatic Relations.

In 2015 Parolin was ex officio a member of the Commission of Cardinals of the Institute for the Works of Religion. On 21 September 2020, at the end of its five-year mandate a new board makeup was announced, omitting the Secretary of State, thus Pope Francis did not confirm Parolin in the role. On 15 October 2020, he confirmed Parolin's membership of the Council of Cardinals.

Following the Taliban victory in Afghanistan in August 2021, Pope Francis appointed him to engage in talks with the Taliban in order to discourage them from taking reprisal measures on civilians who worked with the coalition.

A communiqué from Cardinal Parolin on the 2022 Russian invasion of Ukraine, without naming Vladimir Putin, said that while the worst-case scenario was unfolding, "there is still time for goodwill, there is still room for negotiation, there is still room to exercise a wisdom that prevents partisan interests from prevailing, that protects the legitimate aspirations of all and spares the world the folly and horrors of war". The previous day Pope Francis had urged politicians to make an exercise of conscience before God for their actions over Ukraine, and declared 2 March, Ash Wednesday, as an international day of fasting and prayer for peace.

In May 2022, Cardinal Parolin stated that supplying weapons to Ukraine to help it defend itself is morally legitimate, "There is a right to armed defence in the case of aggression."

Distinctions
 : Knight Grand Cross of the Order of Merit of the Italian Republic
 : Cross of the Order of the Republic of Serbia (2015)
 : Order of the Star of Romania
 : Band of the Order of the Aztec Eagle
 : Order of the Three Stars (10 May 2021)

See also
Cardinals created by Francis

References

Additional sources

External links

 
Interview, Nuncio to Venezuela, 2013

|-

|-

 

|-
 

|-

|-

|-
 

|-

|-

 

1955 births
Apostolic Nuncios to Venezuela
Cardinals created by Pope Francis
Cardinal Secretaries of State
21st-century Italian cardinals
21st-century Italian Roman Catholic titular archbishops
Knights Grand Cross of the Order of Merit of the Italian Republic
Living people
Members of the Congregation for Bishops
Members of the Congregation for the Doctrine of the Faith
Members of the Congregation for the Oriental Churches
Members of the Congregation for Divine Worship and the Discipline of the Sacraments
Pontifical Ecclesiastical Academy alumni
Recipients of the Order of the Star of Romania
People from the Province of Vicenza